The discography of Canadian country music group Family Brown consists of 11 studio albums and 42 singles. Active from 1967 to 1990, the group charted 42 singles on the RPM Country Tracks chart in Canada, including four number one singles. Seven singles also charted on the Billboard Hot Country Singles chart in the U.S., including the top 30 single "But It's Cheating."

Studio albums

Compilation albums

Singles

1970s

1980s and 1990s

Music videos

References

Discographies of Canadian artists
Country music discographies